Samet Geyik (born January 12, 1993) is a Turkish professional basketball player for Fenerbahçe of the BSL and EuroLeague.

Professional career
Geyik began his career with Bornova Belediye in the 2009–10 season. He moved to Tofaş Burşa in 2011. He joined Darüşşafaka Istanbul for the 2015–16 season.

He moved to Karşıyaka Izmir in January 2016 on loan. He joined the Turkish EuroLeague club Efes Istanbul for the 2016–17 season.

On 25 June 2020 he signed with Türk Telekom of the Turkish Super League (BSL).

On 20 June 2022 he signed with Fenerbahçe Beko of the Basketball Super League (BSL).

Turkish national team
Geyik was a regular member of the junior national teams of Turkey. With Turkey's junior national teams, he played at the 2009 FIBA Europe Under-16 Championship, the 2010 FIBA Europe Under-18 Championship, the 2011 FIBA Europe Under-18 Championship, the 2012 FIBA Europe Under-20 Championship, and the 2013 FIBA Europe Under-20 Championship. He won the bronze medal at the 2011 FIBA Europe Under-18 Championship.

He has also been a member of the senior men's Turkish national basketball team. With Turkey's senior team, he played at the 2016 FIBA World Olympic Qualifying Tournament - Manila.

References

External links
Euroleague.net Profile
FIBA.com Profile (archive)
Eurobasket.com profile
TBLStat.net Profile
Twitter 

1993 births
Anadolu Efes S.K. players
Basketball players at the 2010 Summer Youth Olympics
Beşiktaş men's basketball players
Bornova Belediye players
Darüşşafaka Basketbol players
Fenerbahçe men's basketball players
Karşıyaka basketball players
Living people
Power forwards (basketball)
Tofaş S.K. players
Turkish men's basketball players
Türk Telekom B.K. players